The voiceless labial–velar plosive or stop is a type of consonantal sound, used in some spoken languages. To make this sound, one can say Coe but with the lips closed as if one were saying Poe; the lips are to be released at the same time as or a fraction of a second after the C of Coe.

The voiceless labial–velar plosive is found in Vietnamese and various languages in West and Central Africa. In Yoruba it is written with a simple .

Features

Features of the voiceless labial–velar stop:

Occurrence

Rounded variant
Some languages, especially in Papua New Guinea and in Vanuatu, combine this voiceless labial–velar stop with a labial–velar approximant release, hence . Thus Mwotlap (Banks Islands, north Vanuatu) has  ('my father-in-law').

In the Banks Islands languages which have it, the phoneme  is written  in local orthographies.
In other languages of Vanuatu further south (such as South Efate, or  Lenakel), the same segment is spelled .

See also
 List of phonetics topics
 Doubly articulated consonant

Notes

References

External links
 

Labial–velar consonants
Voiceless oral consonants
Central consonants
Voiceless stops
Pulmonic consonants